A revolutionary generation is a generation of people for whom a revolution was a major event or influence in their lives.  Such revolutions are usually associated with particular nations.

Americas

Cuba
The revolutionaries of 1959 in Cuba were known as the Generation of the Centenary after the 100 year anniversary of the birth of José Martí in 1853.

United States
Evarts Boutell Greene dated the generation of the American Revolution as being from 1763 to 1790.

Asia

China
The first political generation of leaders in the People's Republic of China are part  of the revolutionary generation in China, such as Mao Zedong, Zhu De and Zhou Enlai,

Israel
The Second Aliyah generation was arguably the most important and influential aliyah. It took place between 1904 and 1914, during which approximately 40,000 Jews immigrated into Ottoman Palestine, mostly from Russia and Poland, some from Yemen. They were the generation that created the social, political and cultural foundations of the State of Israel.

Europe

France
The Université state education system established by Napoleon created a post-revolutionary generation in France.

Germany
The 1840s were a decisive decade which culminated in the Revolutions of 1848 which defined a generation of Germans.

Romania
In Romania, people who were born in 1989 are called the Revolution Generation , in reference to the Romanian Revolution of 1989 that ended the brutal Communist regime of Nicolae Ceaușescu and brought democracy and rule of law to Romania.

Yugoslavia
The generation that came of age during or immediately after World War II and subsequent rise of communism. It is a generation marked by greater social mobility in comparison to previous period of Kingdom of Yugoslavia, which permitted the large section of population to obtain education. It was also marked by rapid urbanization and industrialization of the country, with a big population shift from rural to urban areas.

References

External links

Cultural generations
Revolutions